Proportional representation is a proportional representation constituency of the National Assembly of South Korea. The constituency consists of South Korea (nationwide).

It is a party-list proportional representation, adopt a closed list system.

History 
The nationwide proportional representation system was introduced for the first time in the 1963 election. The system at that time was to allocate proportional representation seats according to the percentage of votes won by each party in the single-member constituency.

However, on 19 July 2001, the Constitutional Court ruled the system unconstitutional that it is against the principle of democracy to regard support for a candidate of single-member constituency as support for the party to which the candidate belongs.

Thus, the Public Election Act was revised to separate single-member constituency and proportional representation votes and applied from the 2004 election.

In addition, half of seats of the proportional representation was allocated to the first party until the 1988 election, but it was abolished in 1990.

Members of the National Assembly

Election results

Summary

2016 
Note
 #: List rank assigned by the party

2012 
Note
 #: List rank assigned by the party

2008 
Note
 #: List rank assigned by the party

2004 
Notes
 #: List rank assigned by the party
 Deleted candidate: Withdrew candidate

References 

Constituencies of the National Assembly (South Korea)